Tanabi Esporte Clube, or simply Tanabi, is a Brazilian football team based in Tanabi, São Paulo. Founded in 1942, it plays in Campeonato Paulista Segunda Divisão.

The club is nicknamed Índio da Noroeste.

History
Tanabi was founded on December 18, 1942. They won the Campeonato Paulista Série A3 in 1956.

Achievements
 Campeonato Paulista Série A3:
 Winners (1): 1956

Stadium
The club plays its home games at Estádio Alberto Víctolo, usually called Albertão, which has a maximum capacity of 15,200.

Colors
They play in green shirts, white shorts and green socks.

See also
 Federação Paulista de Futebol
 List of football clubs in Brazil

External links
 Futebol Interior
 Arquivo de Clubes

Football clubs in São Paulo (state)
Association football clubs established in 1942
1942 establishments in Brazil